Luzany may refer to:
Lužany (disambiguation), several places in Slovakia
Łużany, Podlaskie Voivodeship, Poland